Móricgát is a  village in Bács-Kiskun county, in the Southern Great Plain region of southern Hungary.

Geography

External links 
 Móricgát hivatalos honlapja
 Móricgát a Gyalogló.hu-n

Populated places in Bács-Kiskun County